The 2012 Home United FC season involves Home United competing in the 2012 S.League. They are also competing in the 2012 AFC Cup after winning the 2011 Singapore Cup.

Squad

S.League squad

Transfers

Pre-season transfers

In

Out

Mid-season transfers

In

Out

Team statistics

Appearances and goals

Numbers in parentheses denote appearances as substitute.

Competitions

S.League

League table

Matches

Singapore Cup

Quarter finals

Singapore League Cup

Group C

Quarter finals

AFC Cup

Group stage

Knock out Stage

References

Home United
2012